Leroy Smith may refer to:

 LeRoy Smith, football coach
 Leroy Smith (American football), All-American football player for the University of Iowa in 1991
 Leroy Smith (basketball), basketball player
 Hezekiah Leroy Gordon Smith, aka Stuff Smith (1909–1967), American jazz violinist
 Leroy Smith, member of British soul band Sweet Sensation
 Leroy Smith, a fictional character from the Tekken series video game